Máel Muire of Atholl was Mormaer of Atholl at the beginning of the 12th century, until sometime perhaps in the 1130s. According to the Orkneyinga Saga, Máel Muire was a son of king Donnchad I and a  younger brother of King Máel Coluim III. A Malmori d' Athótla is mentioned in a charter relating to a year after 1130, contained within the Book of Deer.

Bibliography
 Anderson, Alan Orr, Early Sources of Scottish History: AD 500-1286, 2 Vols, (Edinburgh, 1922
 Roberts, John L., Lost Kingdoms: Celtic Scotland in the Middle Ages, (Edinburgh, 1997

External links
Gaelic Notitiae to the Book of Deer

People from Perth and Kinross
11th-century births
1130s deaths
Mormaers of Atholl
12th-century mormaers
Sons of kings